Strings of Steel is a 1926 action film serial directed by Henry MacRae. The film is considered to be lost.

Cast
 William Desmond as Ned Brown
 Eileen Sedgwick as Gloria Van Norton
 Albert J. Smith as Peter Allen
 Arthur Morrison as Jim Hogan
 George Ovey as Willie Gray
 Grace Cunard as Bowery Belle
 Alphonse Martell as Alexander Graham Bell
 Taylor N. Duncan as Theodore N. Vail
 Blanche Fisher
 Dorothy Gulliver

See also
 List of film serials
 List of film serials by studio

References

External links

1926 films
American silent serial films
American black-and-white films
Universal Pictures film serials
Films directed by Henry MacRae
Lost American films
1920s action films
American action films
1926 lost films
Lost action films
1920s American films